The Boulevard Mortier is a boulevard in the 20th arrondissement of Paris, France. It is one of the Boulevards of the Marshals, which circle the outer parts of the city.

Route 
The boulevard starts at Porte de Bagnolet and ends at Porte des Lilas, where it is continued by boulevard Sérurier. The housing estate  is located on the west side, near Porte de Bagnolet.

The boulevard was accessible through the Petite Ceinture bus line. Now it can be reached through the Métro Line 3.

History 

The French war department had completed the Thiers wallincluding fortifications, a dry moat, a Rue Militaire and a large bermaround 1840. In 1859, the military engineering service gave conditional control to the Paris city council. The expansion of the land area of Paris in 1860, by annexing bordering communities, created a situation where everything within the Thiers wall was Paris and everything without was not. The Thiers wall, with its accompanying berm and moat, led to a profound disruption and complication of the synergistic relationship between Paris and its suburbs. Paris city council started upgrading and conversion of some sections of the Rue Militaire into boulevards in 1861, with the (yet unnamed) Boulevard de Mortier one of the first stretches to open.

In 1864, the boulevard was named after Édouard Mortier (1768–1835), Duke of Trévise and Marshal of France.

Each section of the upgraded Rue Militaire was then named for a marshal of the First French Empire (1804–1814) who served under Napoleon I, leading to the entire ring being collectively called the Boulevards of the Marshals. The Boulevards of the Marshals concept was almost fully realized by 1932, though the final three sections, closing the ring, would not be completed until 2005. Of the 22 boulevards, 19 have been named for Mortier or one of his fellow First Empire marshals.

Important building 
 After No. 19 is rue Camille-Bombois, a narrow street with a stairway that goes up to rue Irénée-Blanc; it belongs to the Campagne à Paris estate.
 On 24 August 1944, the group Francs-Tireurs et Partisans of Saint-Fargeau attacked an SS row at a barricade located at No. 67, at the crossing of Boulevard Mortier and rue de la Justice.
 Jacques Duclos is said to have resided at No. 82-88 in July 1940.
 No 141: , headquarters of the Directorate-General for External Security (DGSE).

References 

Boulevards in Paris
Streets in the 20th arrondissement of Paris
1863 establishments in France